This article presents the discography of influential guitar player and vocalist Tony Rice.

Solo albums
 Guitar (1973)
 California Autumn (1975)
 Tony Rice (1977)
 Church Street Blues (1983)
 Cold on the Shoulder (1984)
 Me & My Guitar (1986)
 Native American (1988)
 Tony Rice Plays and Sings Bluegrass (1993)
 Crossings (1994)
 Tony Rice Sings Gordon Lightfoot (1996)
 58957:The Bluegrass Guitar Collection (2003)
 Night Flyer: The Singer Songwriter Collection (2008)

As Tony Rice Unit
 Acoustics (1978)
 Manzanita (1979)
 Mar West (1980) 
 Still Inside (1981) 
 Backwaters (1982)
 Devlin (1987)
 Unit of Measure (2000)

With David Grisman Quintet
 The David Grisman Quintet (1977)
 Hot Dawg (1979)
 Mondo Mando (1981)
 DGQ-20 (1996)

With Bluegrass Album Band
 The Bluegrass Album (1981)
 Bluegrass Album, Vol. 2 (1982)
 Bluegrass Album, Vol. 3 - California Connection (1983)
 Bluegrass Album, Vol. 4 (1984)
 Bluegrass Album, Vol. 5 - Sweet Sunny South (1989)
 Bluegrass Album, Vol. 6 - Bluegrass Instrumentals (1996)

With Norman Blake
 Blake & Rice (1987)
 Norman Blake and Tony Rice 2 (1990)

As Rice Brothers
 The Rice Brothers (1989)
 The Rice Brothers 2 (1994)

With Peter Rowan
 You Were There For Me (2004)
 Quartet (2007)

As Rice, Rice, Hillman & Pedersen
 Out Of The Woodwork (1997)
 Rice, Rice, Hillman & Pedersen (1999)
 Runnin' Wild (2001)

With J.D. Crowe & the New South
 Bluegrass Evolution (1973)
 J.D. Crowe & The New South (1975)

Collaboration with other artists
 Skaggs & Rice (1980) with Ricky Skaggs
 Clawgrass Mark Johnson with the Rice Brothers and Friends (1994) with Mark Johnson
 Tone Poems (1994) with David Grisman
 River Suite for Two Guitars (1995) with John Carlini
 The Pizza Tapes (2000) with David Grisman & Jerry Garcia
 Hartford Rice and Clements (2011) with John Hartford & Vassar Clements

As session musician
 The David Grisman Rounder Record (1976) for David Grisman
 Something Auld, Something Newgrass, Something Borrowed, Something Bluegrass (1976) for Bill Keith
 Catfish for Supper (1979) for Jon Sholle
 Eric Thompson's Bluegrass Guitar (1979) for Eric Thompson
 Roses in the Snow (1980) for Emmylou Harris
Fiddlistics (1981) for Darol Anger
Released (1984) for Todd Phillips (musician)
 Double Time (1984) for Béla Fleck
 Hometown Girl (1987) for Mary Chapin Carpenter
 Drive (1988) for Béla Fleck
 When It Rains (1991) for Lou Reid
 Cold Virginia Night (1994) for Ronnie Bowman
 Tales from the Acoustic Planet (1995) for Béla Fleck
 Leading Roll (1997) for Sammy Shelor
 The Bluegrass Sessions: Tales from the Acoustic Planet, Vol. 2 (1999) for Béla Fleck
 Fair Weather (2000) for Alison Brown
 In the Blue Room (2000) for Alan Bibey
 Don't Fret It (2002) for Rickie Simpkins
 Starting Over (2002) for Ronnie Bowman
 Carry Me Across the Mountain (2003) for Dan Tyminski
 The Bluegrass Fiddle Album (2003) for Aubrey Haynie
 Not Too Far From The Tree (2006) for  Bryan Sutton
 Gaining Wisdom (2007) for Donna Hughes
 Secrets (2008) for Sierra Hull
 Almost Live (2009) for Bryan Sutton

Chronological discography

Pre-1970
 1968 Session: Bobby Atkins, Frank Poindexter, and Tony Rice (1968 - Album apparently not released until 1981)) OLD HOMESTEAD 126

1970 - 1980
 Guitar (1973)
 Bluegrass Evolution (1973)
 J.D. Crowe & The New South (1975)
 California Autumn (1975)
 Tony Rice (1977)
 The David Grisman Quintet (1977)
 Hot Dawg (1979)
 Acoustics (1979)
 Manzanita (1978)
 Mar West (1980)
 Skaggs & Rice (1980)

1981 - 1990
 Still Inside (1981)
 Mondo Mando (1981) 
 The Bluegrass Album (1981) 
 Backwaters (1982)
 Bluegrass Album, Vol. 2 (1982) 
 Bluegrass Album, Vol. 3 - California Connection (1983)
 Church Street Blues (1983)
 Bluegrass Album, Vol. 4 (1984)
 Cold on the Shoulder (1984)
 Me & My Guitar (1986)
 Blake & Rice (1987)
 Native American (1988)
 Bluegrass Album, Vol. 5 - Sweet Sunny South (1989)
 The Rice Brothers (1989)
 Norman Blake and Tony Rice 2 (1990)
 Devlin (1990)

1991 - 2000

 Tony Rice Plays and Sings Bluegrass (1993)
 The Rice Brothers 2 (1994)
 Crossings (1994)
 Tone Poems (1994)
 River Suite for Two Guitars (1995)
 Bluegrass Album, Vol. 6 - Bluegrass Instrumentals (1996)
 DGQ-20 (1996)
 Tony Rice Sings Gordon Lightfoot (1996)
 Out Of The Woodwork (1997)
 Rice, Rice, Hillman & Pedersen (1999)
 Unit of Measure (2000)
 The Pizza Tapes (2000)

2001 - 2011
 Runnin' Wild (2001)
 58957:The Bluegrass Guitar Collection (2003)
 You Were There For Me (2004)
 Quartet (2007)
 Night Flyer: The Singer Songwriter Collection (2008)
 Tony Rice - The Bill Monroe Collection (Rounder Records compilation) (2011)

Rice, Tony